Same-sex marriage in Yukon has been legal since July 14, 2004, immediately following a ruling from the Supreme Court of Yukon. The territory became the fourth jurisdiction in Canada (and the seventh worldwide) to legalise same-sex marriage, after the provinces of Ontario, British Columbia and Quebec. Yukon was the first of Canada's three territories to legalise same-sex marriage, and the only one to do so before the federal legalisation of same-sex marriage in July 2005 by the Parliament of Canada.

Court ruling
In July 2003, Justice Minister Elaine Taylor said the government was taking a "wait-and-see" approach to same-sex marriage in Yukon, and would prefer for the Supreme Court of Canada or the Parliament of Canada to settle the issue, "I think it's very important to have your ducks lined up, so to speak. The thing that I would hate to see, is that in fact, we did start issuing marriage licenses today or tomorrow, and the bill in fact did not live up to the scrutiny of the Supreme Court of Canada, or perhaps did not even go through the House of Commons. Then there would be somewhat of legal quagmire. We want to bring certainty to those individuals who want to be recognized as same-sex couples. We want to take a responsible position."

In January 2004, Rob Edge and Stephen Dunbar were denied a marriage licence at the Vital Statistics Office in Whitehorse. "We could have driven across the border to British Columbia, but that wasn't good enough. My family and I contributed a lot to this community over the years and I wanted to be married here to the man I love. I'm a Yukoner. I don't want a license that's not recognized by my government. I knew my timing was right and that the territory was ready for it.", Dunbar said. The couple brought suit in Dunbar & Edge v. Yukon (Government of) & Canada (A.G.) against the Yukon and federal governments in June 2004. Their lawyer, Jim Tucker, used a novel approach: rather than arguing on the basis of Section 15 of the Canadian Charter of Rights and Freedoms as in the previous cases, he argued that the Federal Government's failure to appeal the decisions legalising same-sex marriage in Ontario, British Columbia and Quebec signalled a change in Canadian common law regarding marriage. Martha McCarthy, a lawyer who had represented the couples in Ontario and Quebec, said "Same-sex couples should not have to wait patiently for their rights to be upheld. The federal government accepted not only the Ontario and B.C. court rulings that marriage licenses be issued to same-sex couples, but also the Quebec Court of Appeal's ruling that the law has changed across the country. If they accept that in Quebec, how can they now take a different position in the Yukon?"

On July 14, 2004, Supreme Court Justice Peter McIntyre agreed that the Federal Government was inconsistent in its approach to the definition of marriage, a federal responsibility, since it had not appealed the first three decisions. Therefore, the territory's failure to provide marriage licences to same-sex couples meant that the law was being inconsistently applied in Yukon. Justice McIntyre declared same-sex marriages legal in Yukon, and ordered the government to issue a marriage licence to Mr. Edge and Mr. Dunbar. The judge obtained verbal promises from the Yukon Government that the couple would be granted a marriage licence. Premier Dennis Fentie praised the ruling. Laurie Arron, from Egale Canada, said, "This ruling sends a message that governments across the country must now accept the Charter rights of same-sex couples to marry in a civil ceremony. There is one law for the whole country, and that law includes same-sex couples."

Territorial legislation
In May 2002, the Yukon Legislative Assembly approved a bill allowing same-sex couples to adopt children jointly. The law took effect on 1 January 2003. In December 2014, the Assembly amended the territorial Marriage Act to replace references to "husband and wife" with "spouses" and add "or spouse" in section 13. The amendments received royal assent by Commissioner Doug Phillips on 11 December and took effect on 1 June 2015. The Act states:

Further legislation, the Equality of Spouses Statute Law Amendment Act 2018, was passed by the Assembly in October 2018. It replaced references to "husband and wife" and "a man and a woman" with gender-neutral language in other acts, including the Evidence Act and the Family Property and Support Act. The law was assented by Commissioner Angélique Bernard.

Marriage statistics
44 same-sex couples married in Yukon between July 2004 and July 2014. The 2016 Canadian census showed that there were 70 same-sex spouses living in Yukon, with 55 (78.6%) being women. The census also showed that about 1.9% of Whitehorse women in couples were in same-sex relationships; the second highest in Canada after Yellowknife in the Northwest Territories. Men in same-sex couples accounted for 0.7% of men in couples.

Religious performance
In July 2019, the synod of the Anglican Church of Canada passed a resolution known as "A Word to the Church", allowing its dioceses to choose whether to perform same-sex marriages. The canons of the Diocese of Yukon do not explicitly prohibit same-sex marriages, and one of the only mentions to marriage defines it as being "between two people". The former bishop, Larry Robertson, who retired in 2019, was vocally opposed to same-sex marriage.

See also

Same-sex marriage in Canada
LGBT rights in Canada

Notes

References

External links
 
 Dunbar & Edge v. Yukon (Government of) & Canada (A.G.), 2004 YKSC 54 (CanLII) – text of the ruling

Yukon
Yukon law
2004 in LGBT history